= T-Mobile Pulse Mini =

Mobile phone

- Also sold as: Huawei U8110 (International)
- Brand: T-Mobile
- Manufacturer: Huawei
- Type: Smartphone
- First released: February 2010
- Compatible networks: GSM / HSPA
- Form factor: Candybar
- Dimensions: 106 mm (4.2 in) H 57 mm (2.2 in) W 14 mm (0.55 in) D
- Weight: 110 g (3.9 oz)
- Operating system: Android 2.1 (Eclair)
- System-on-chip: Qualcomm MSM7227 Snapdragon S1
- CPU: 600 MHz ARM 11
- GPU: Adreno 200
- Storage: 300MB
- Removable storage: microSDHC (dedicated slot)
- SIM: Mini-SIM
- Battery: Removable Li-Ion 1150 mAh battery
- Rear camera: 3.15 MP
- Front camera: No
- Display: 2.8 inches, 24.3 cm2 (~40.2% screen-to-body ratio), TFT resistive touchscreen, 256K colors, 240 x 320 pixels (~143 ppi density)
- References: "T-Mobile Pulse Mini - Full phone specifications". GSMArena.

The T-Mobile Pulse Mini (also known as the Huawei U8110) is an Android touchscreen smartphone announced in February 2010 at the MWC 2010 and manufactured by Huawei. It was shipped to Europe.

The T-Mobile Pulse Mini, features a 2.8-inch TFT resistive touchscreen with a QVGA resolution of 240 x 320 pixels, a Qualcomm MSM7227 Snapdragon S1 chipset, which includes a 600 MHz ARM 11 CPU and an Adreno 200 GPU, an internal storage of 300MB, which can be expanded further via a dedicated microSDHC card slot, a 3.15-megapixel rear camera and it is supplied by a removable 1150 mAh lithium-ion battery.

The device runs on Android 2.1 (Eclair).
